Palotabozsok is a village in Baranya County, Hungary.

External links 
 Street map 

Populated places in Baranya County
Hungarian German communities